Bruning or Brüning is a surname. Notable people with the surname include:

 Elfriede Brüning (1910–2014), German journalist and novelist
 Heinrich Brüning (1885–1970), German chancellor of the Weimar Republic
 Jon Bruning, American politician
 Michael Brüning, American beach volleyball player
 Monika Brüning, German politician
 Peter Brüning, German artist
 Robert Bruning, Australian actor
 Hans Heinrich Brüning Brookstedt, Peruvian archaeologist

German-language surnames
Surnames from given names